The Schoenstein Organ at the Conference Center is a pipe organ built by Schoenstein & Co., San Francisco, California located in the Conference Center of the Church of Jesus Christ of Latter-day Saints (LDS Church) in Salt Lake City, Utah. The organ was completed in 2003. It is composed of 160 speaking stops spread over five manuals and pedals. Along with the nearby Salt Lake Tabernacle organ, it is typically used to accompany the Tabernacle Choir at Temple Square. Schoenstein & Co.'s president and tonal director, Jack Bethards, describes it as "an American Romantic organ" that is "probably more English than anything else."

Originally, the builders were told the instrument would likely only be used during the LDS Church's April and October general conferences and a few other occasions annually. However, in addition to these events, the organ is now played for the second of two daily concerts during the summer tourist season (the first concert takes place in the Tabernacle, the regular home of the daily noon concerts), the annual First Presidency's Christmas Devotional, the Tabernacle Choir's Christmas concert series, and other numerous other performances throughout the year. 

The organ is about two-thirds the size of the Tabernacle organ in number of pipes (the Conference Center Organ has 7,708 pipes in 130 ranks, while the Tabernacle Organ has 11,623 pipes in 206 ranks). Former Tabernacle organist John Longhurst described it as a "project of immense proportion." According to Bethards, when played as a solo instrument, it is never amplified; its sound carries through the auditorium under the organ's power alone.

Longhurst described his reaction to the announcement in 1996 of the building of the Conference Center and his involvement in the building of the organ as follows:

"Needless to say, [the announcement of the Conference Center] made it difficult for me to concentrate on the rest of the Conference session. I could only begin to envision a space like President Hinckley had described. I assumed that an organ would be necessary in that building and immediately began considering what that instrument might be. By this time Robert Cundick had retired, and Richard Elliott was now on staff. As it turned out, all of the experience previously gained working on the other Temple Square organs (and particularly the Tabernacle organ, which we had thought of as a culmination) we now viewed as preparation for what was to follow. President Hinckley's announcement that Easter morning began a journey for us organists that would not conclude for seven years, when the Conference Center's Schoenstein & Co. organ was finally declared finished, just in time for the A.G.O. bi-regional convention held in Salt Lake City in the summer of 2003."

The organ includes a number of so-called "mechanical aids," though these are actually electronic. According to principal Tabernacle organist Richard Elliott, these include a "built-in recorder," which allows organists to play a performance, and then go out into the auditorium and listen as the organ's computer replays the piece by physically sounding the pipes.

Basic specification
Builder: Schoenstein & Co., San Francisco, California, USA
Opus No: 139
Console (designed similarly to the Tabernacle Organ's in an attempt to minimize inconvenience when switching between the instruments):
Mobile
5 manuals
Pedal board: concave & radiating
Stop controls: drawknob
Speaking stops: 103
Ranks: 130
Pipes: 7,708
Wind:
Power: 6 Ventus blowers
Pressures:
Choir: 140mm
Great: 140mm, 190mm
Swell: 140mm, 250mm
Solo: 250mm, 375mm
Orchestral: 250mm, 375mm
Pedal: 140mm, 190mm, 250mm, 375mm

List of stops

References

External links

Latter Day Saint culture
Salt Lake City, Schoenstein Organ at the Conference Center